Edward Winterhalder (born 1955) is an American author who has written more than twenty-five books about motorcycle clubs and outlaw biker culture published in the English, French, German and Spanish languages; a television producer who has created programs about motorcycle clubs and the outlaw biker lifestyle for networks and broadcasters worldwide;  a singer, songwriter, musician and record producer;  and screenwriter.

Early life
Winterhalder was born in New England, grew up in southern Connecticut, and moved to Oklahoma in 1975 after serving in the US Army. In Oklahoma he joined the Rogues Motorcycle Club and was a close associate of the Bandidos outlaw motorcycle club from 1979 to 1997, and a high-ranking member of the Bandidos from 1997 to 2003.

Music 
Under the pseudonym of Warren Winters, Winterhalder formed the Warren Winters Band in the 1980s after fronting the Connecticut Dust Band during the late 1970s and early 1980s. Playing guitar and singing lead vocals, he utilized a group of studio musicians and his childhood friend Kurt Newman (drums) to record the As I Was debut album in 1984 on the Shovster Records label. In 1988, the Crossbar Hotel album was recorded at Grace Recording Studios in Connecticut with Warren Winters (guitar & lead vocals), Andy Rutman (guitar), Kurt Newman (drums), Lou Sabetta (keyboards) and Mario Figueroa (bass). On both albums, the song writing credits noted that all songs were written by Edward Winterhalder.

In 1995, a Best Of Warren Winters CD was mastered and produced by Chris Westerman of Blackwater Sound in New Hampshire. Along with hit songs from the As I Was and Crossbar Hotel albums, the CD featured a few songs from his Connecticut Dust Band days and some unreleased tracks from studio sessions. While the music of the Warren Winters Band was once described as being somewhere between rock n roll and progressive country, a 2011 article in France compared the Warren Winters Band sound to Acey Stone, Circuit Rider and Justen O'Brien.

In February 2019, Kentucky-based Sophomore Lounge Records announced that a 30th anniversary limited edition vinyl LP record reissue of the Warren Winters Band Crossbar Hotel album would be released on April 5, 2019. Then And Now by the Warren Winters Band was released in March 2020; the record included previously unreleased songs written by Edward Winterhalder that were recorded between 1974 and 2020.

Bandidos
In May 1997 Winterhalder established the Oklahoma chapter of the Bandidos and was the high-ranking member of the Bandidos responsible for the assimilation of a Canadian outlaw motorcycle club known as the Rock Machine into the Bandidos during the Quebec Biker War, which became the first Canadian chapters of the Bandidos motorcycle club. Winterhalder left the Bandidos in September 2003 to spend time with his family, pursue business interests and better manage his construction company.

Career
Since 2005, Winterhalder has authored or co-authored books, and produced television shows about the Harley-Davidson biker culture. He is the creator/executive producer of Steel Horse Cowboys: Leather, Chrome & Thunder, Real American Bikers: War Dogs MC, Biker Chicz and Living on the Edge: Riding with the Vietnam Vets Motorcycle Club in Pennsylvania, and is the subject of a feature-length documentary movie that was being filmed in 2015 and 2016 in Pennsylvania, Michigan and Dubai.

Winterhalder is a consultant to the entertainment industry for television shows and feature films that focus on the biker lifestyle, has appeared in TV shows on National Geographic aka Nat Geo (US, Australia, UK & New Zealand), History Television (Canada), the History Channel (US & Australia), Global TV (Canada), Prime TV (New Zealand), and the AB Groupe (France, Switzerland, Austria, Belgium, the Netherlands and southwest Germany), and has been interviewed on Fox News Channel, the O'Reilly Factor hosted by Bill O'Reilly, ABC Nightline, MSNBC's NewsNation with Tamron Hall, Inside Edition, and CBC.

He has been a featured author on Bravo TV's "The Word" in the same episode as JK Rowling, has appeared in the Outlaw Bikers television series in Canada, and been quoted in magazines and newspapers such as GQ, Vice Media, USA Today,  Seattle Weekly, the Austin Chronicle, the Sunshine Coast Daily in Australia, and The Guardian in England UK.

Winterhalder was a keynote speaker at the 2019 Emirates Airline Festival of Literature in Dubai; his session was moderated by Sameer Al Jaberi, a native of the United Arab Emirates. In 2015, he was interviewed by Pat Campbell for the Pat Campbell radio show on 1170 KFAQ in Tulsa, Oklahoma.

Books and DVDs

Videos

Discography

As Producer
 At Long Last - LP (1980) – Connecticut Dust Band 
 As I Was - LP (1984) – Warren Winters Band 
 Crossbar Hotel - LP (1988) – Warren Winters Band 
 Best Of Warren Winters - CD (1995) – Warren Winters Band 
 Then And Now - LP (2020) – Warren Winters Band

As Songwriter

References

External links
 
 

1955 births
Living people
Bandidos Motorcycle Club
Motorcycling mass media people
American male writers